NHP may refer to:

 Natural health product, a term used in Canada to describe natural supplements
 National Historical Park, a term used in the United States to describe historic and/or significant natural areas
 Necrotising hepatopancreatitis, a lethal epizootic disease of farmed shrimp
 Nevada Highway Patrol, a division of the Nevada Department of Public Safety
 Nominal horsepower, an early 19th-century rule of thumb used to estimate the power of steam engines
 Non-human primate, primate species except humans